Mole Valley is a local government district in Surrey, England. Its council is based in Dorking.

The other town in the district is Leatherhead. The largest villages are Ashtead, Fetcham and Great Bookham, in the northern third of the district.  Most of the district is on the escarpments of or adjoins the Surrey Hills AONB (the North Downs and Greensand Ridge including locally Leith Hill, Polesden Lacey, Box Hill and Denbies Wine Estate, the largest vineyard in the country and several golf courses) The North Downs are followed or parallelled by the Pilgrims' Way.  There are stations on the London–Worthing and Reading–Gatwick Airport railways, and in the northern third, a commuter stopping-service pattern line, London–Guildford (via Epsom) line.

The A24 road and the M25 motorway are the main thoroughfares and relative to London the incidence of car ownership is high.  The area hosts hill-focussed sub-laps of the London–Surrey Classic cycling tour each year.

Towns
 Dorking
 Leatherhead

Other settlements

Governance

Mole Valley District Council is elected by thirds: one-third of councillors are elected at each election, each serving four year terms; three years out of four having elections.

The council was however elected across all areas in 2000 after major boundary changes to the wards.

Although Mole Valley (UK Parliament constituency) has been Conservative for a long time, Mole Valley District Council has, with Independent/RA and Liberal Democrats, for long periods been under no overall control.

Between May 2015 and May 2018, Mole Valley Liberal Democrats gained two council seats in by-elections (Holmwoods June 2015 gain from UKIP, Leatherhead North June 2016 gain from Conservatives), and one Conservative councillor defected to Beare Green Independent (May 2017). The Liberal Democrats then made a net gain of one in May 2018, pushing the Council back into no overall control. However, Conservatives continued to control the administration with the support of the Independents, with three Ashtead Independents becoming members of the Cabinet.

The overall composition established in May 2018 is 20 Conservatives, 14 Liberal Democrats, and 7 Independents (6 Ashtead Independents and 1 Beare Green Independent). There are no Labour, UKIP or Green Party councillors.

Party control
 1974–1980: No overall control
 1980–1982: Independent control
 1982–1994: No overall control
 1994–1995: Liberal Democrat control
 1995–2006: No overall control
 2006–2008: Conservative control
 2010–2015: No overall control
 2015–2018: Conservative control
 2018–2019: No overall control
 2019–present: Liberal Democrat control

Surrey County Council
Surrey County Council, elected every four years, obtains six representatives from this area:

History
The district, named after the River Mole, was formed on 1 April 1974, under the Local Government Act 1972, by a merger of the urban districts of Dorking and Leatherhead and most of the Dorking and Horley Rural District.

Demographics
A Legatum Prosperity Index published by the Legatum Institute in October 2016 showed Mole Valley as the second most prosperous council area in the United Kingdom, after the nearby Borough of Waverley.

Churches graded II* or above

Environmental concerns
In May 2006, a report commissioned by British Gas showed that housing in Mole Valley produced the twentieth highest average carbon emissions in the country at 6,928 kg of carbon dioxide per dwelling.

In 2008 a group of residents got together and formed The Green Mole Forum  with the aim of promoting sustainable development in Mole Valley both by providing a hub to help residents, and to lobby the council to undertake more sustainable policies.

Emergency services
Mole Valley is served by these emergency services:
 Surrey Police. Dorking Police Station is the lead station in Mole Valley Division, Leatherhead Police Station is now closed.
 South East Coast Ambulance Service The district has two Ambulance Stations – one in North Holmwood ( south of Dorking), and the other in Leatherhead.
 Surrey Fire & Rescue Service, The district has two Fire Stations one in North Holmwood and the other in Leatherhead.
 SURSAR, The district is covered by Surrey Search & Rescue
 Hospital, Each town has a small NHS Hospital with no A&E. They are used for outpatients and rehabilitation.

Sources
 Local elections, 1999
 Local elections, 2000
 Local elections, 2002
 Local elections, 2003
 Local elections, 2004

Freedom of the District
The following people and military units have received the Freedom of the District of Mole Valley.

Individuals

Military Units
 DMRC Headley Court: 25 May 2010.

See also
List of places of worship in Mole Valley

References

External links
 Mole Valley District Council

 
Non-metropolitan districts of Surrey
Coast to Capital Local Enterprise Partnership